Puttur Taluk is a taluka in Dakshina Kannada district of the Indian state of Karnataka. The headquarters is the town of Puttur. There are thirty-seven Panchayat villages in Puttur Taluka.

 Ariyadka
 Aryapu
 Badagannuru
 Bajathuru
 Balnadu
 Bannuru
 Belanduru
 Bettampady
 Hirebandady
 Kabaka
 Kaniyuru
 Kedambady
 Kodimbady
 Koila
 Kolthige
 Munduru
 Narimogaru
 Nettanige Mudnuru
 Panaje
 Savanuru
 Uppinangady
 Volamogaru

Languages (1951)

Notes

External links
 

Taluks of Karnataka
Geography of Dakshina Kannada district